The Rhaetian Railway ABe 8/12, which is also known as the Allegra, is a class of dual voltage metre gauge three car multiple unit trains of the Rhaetian Railway (RhB), which is the main railway network in the Canton of Graubünden, Switzerland.

The class is so named under the Swiss locomotive and railcar classification system. According to that system, ABe 8/12 denotes an electric railcar train with first and second class compartments, and a total of 12 axles, eight of which are drive axles.

Technical details
The ABe 8/12 trains were delivered between 2009 and 2011.  They are used mainly on Rhaetian Railway routes with steep inclines: the Arosa line, the Bernina Railway, and the route from Landquart to Davos.  They are fitted with dual voltage electrical equipment, to enable them to operate on both the Rhaetian Railway's core network, which is electrified at 11 kV 16.7 Hz, and on the Bernina Railway, which is electrified at 1,000 V DC.

Each of the ABe 8/12s is equipped with comfortable air conditioned compartments for both first class and second class passengers.  The first class compartment at the front of each train offers a pleasant view of the track from directly behind the driver.  In the middle of the ABe 8/12s is a large low floor area, which also allows disabled passengers a comfortable ride. Most units entered regular service soon after delivery.

Metre gauge speed record 
On 5 December 2009, during regular pre-service shakedown trials in the Vereina Tunnel, an ABe 8/12 set a new speed record for metre gauge railways of 139 km/h.  The previous record had stood at 134 km/h, and had been held by the Regionalverkehr Bern-Solothurn (RBS).  The maximum speed previously registered on the RhB had been 110 km/h.

Train names 
On 1 May 2010, four trains were baptized in Landquart. The train 3503 is called after the Swiss alpine ski racer Carlo Janka (grown up in Obersaxen GR) who won the world championship and the olympic gold medal in the giant slalom and who is the overall winner in Men's Alpine Skiing World Cup. The train 3504 got the name of Dario Cologna (grown up in Mustair GR) who is the overall winner of Men's cross-country skier and also gold medal winner of Vancouver.

List of trains 

The trains in the class are named, and entered service, as follows:

References

External links 

 Official Rhaetian Railway website
 Manufacturer's site Website of the manufacturer of the ABe 8/12 Allegra
 Datasheet Comprehensive datasheet of the manufacturer (in German)
 Media release Media release about the new speed record (in German)

Stadler Rail multiple units
Multiple units of Switzerland

Rhaetian Railway multiple units